The following is a list of the IRMA's number-one singles of 1998. The dates shown below are Sundays.

See also
1998 in music
List of artists who reached number one in Ireland

1998 in Irish music
1998 record charts
1998